Miguel de Cervantes Saavedra (29 September 1547 (assumed) – 22 April 1616 NS) was an Early Modern Spanish writer widely regarded as the greatest writer in the Spanish language and one of the world's pre-eminent novelists. He is best known for his novel Don Quixote, a work often cited as both the first modern novel and "the first great novel of world literature". A 2002 poll of around 100 well-known authors voted it the "most meaningful book of all time", from among the "best and most central works in world literature".

Much of his life was spent in poverty and obscurity, which led to many of his early works being lost. Despite this, his influence and literary contribution are reflected by the fact that Spanish is often referred to as "the language of Cervantes".

In 1569, Cervantes was forced to leave Spain and move to Rome, where he worked in the household of a cardinal. In 1570, he enlisted in a Spanish Navy infantry regiment, and was badly wounded at the Battle of Lepanto in October 1571. He served as a soldier until 1575, when he was captured by Barbary pirates; after five years in captivity, he was ransomed, and returned to Madrid.

His first significant novel, titled La Galatea, was published in 1585, but he continued to work as a purchasing agent, and later as government tax collector. Part One of Don Quixote was published in 1605, and Part Two in 1615. Other works include the 12 Novelas ejemplares (Exemplary Novels); a long poem, the Viaje del Parnaso (Journey to Parnassus); and Ocho comedias y ocho entremeses (Eight Plays and Eight Interludes). Los trabajos de Persiles y Sigismunda (The Travails of Persiles and Sigismunda), was published posthumously in 1616.

Biography

Despite his subsequent renown, much of Cervantes's life is uncertain, including his name, background and what he looked like. Although he signed himself Cerbantes, his printers used Cervantes, which became the common form. In later life, Cervantes used Saavedra, the name of a distant relative, rather than the more usual Cortinas, after his mother. But historian Luce López-Baralt, claimed that it comes from the word shaibedraa that in Arabic dialect means "one-handed", his nickname during his captivity.

Another area of dispute is his religious background. It has been suggested that not only Cervantes's father but also his mother may have been New Christians. Anthony Cascardi writes, "While the family might have had some claim to nobility they often found themselves in financial straits. Moreover, they were almost certainly of converso origin, that is, converts to Catholicism of Jewish ancestry. In the Spain of Cervantes's days, this meant living under clouds of official suspicion and social mistrust, with far more limited opportunities than were enjoyed by members of the 'Old Christian' caste."

It is generally accepted Miguel de Cervantes was born around 29 September 1547, in Alcalá de Henares. He was the second son of barber-surgeon Rodrigo de Cervantes and his wife, Leonor de Cortinas. Rodrigo came from Córdoba, Andalusia, where his father Juan de Cervantes was an influential lawyer.

1547 to 1566: Early years
Rodrigo was frequently in debt, or searching for work, and moved constantly. Leonor came from Arganda del Rey, and died in October 1593, at the age of 73; surviving legal documents indicate she had seven children, could read and write, and was a resourceful individual with a keen eye for business. When Rodrigo was imprisoned for debt from October 1553 to April 1554, she supported the family on her own.

Cervantes's siblings were Andrés (born 1543), Andrea (born 1544), Luisa (born 1546), Rodrigo (born 1550), Magdalena (born 1554) and Juan. They lived in Córdoba until 1556, when his grandfather died. For reasons that are unclear, Rodrigo did not benefit from his will and the family disappears until 1564 when he filed a lawsuit in Seville.

Seville was then in the midst of an economic boom, and Rodrigo managed rented accommodation for his elder brother Andres, who was a junior magistrate. It is assumed Cervantes attended the Jesuit college in Seville, where one of the teachers was Jesuit playwright Pedro Pablo Acevedo, who moved there in 1561 from Córdoba. However, legal records show his father got into debt once more and in 1566 the family moved to Madrid.

1566 to 1580: Military service and captivity

In the 19th century, a biographer discovered an arrest warrant for a Miguel de Cervantes, dated 15 September 1569, who was charged with wounding Antonio de Sigura in a duel. Although disputed at the time, largely on the grounds such behaviour was unworthy of so great an author, it is now accepted as the most likely reason for Cervantes leaving Madrid.

He eventually made his way to Rome, where he found a position in the household of Giulio Acquaviva, an Italian bishop who spent 1568 to 1569 in Madrid, and was appointed Cardinal in 1570. When the 1570 to 1573 Ottoman–Venetian War began, Spain formed part of the Holy League, a coalition formed to support the Venetian Republic. Possibly seeing an opportunity to have his arrest warrant rescinded, Cervantes went to Naples, then part of the Crown of Aragon.

The military commander in Naples was Alvaro de Sande, a friend of the family, who gave Cervantes a commission under the Marquis de Santa Cruz. At some point, he was joined in Naples by his younger brother Rodrigo. In September 1571, Cervantes sailed on board the Marquesa, part of the Holy League fleet under Don John of Austria, illegitimate half brother of Phillip II of Spain; on 7 October, they defeated the Ottoman fleet at the Battle of Lepanto.

According to his own account, although suffering from malaria, Cervantes was given command of a 12-man skiff, a small boat used for assaulting enemy galleys. The Marquesa lost 40 dead, and 120 wounded, including Cervantes, who received three separate wounds, two in the chest, and another that rendered his left arm useless, this last wound is the reason why he later was called "El Manco de Lepanto" (English:The one-handed man of Lepanto, The one-armed man of Lepanto), a title that followed him for the rest of his life. His actions at Lepanto were a source of pride to the end of his life, while Don John approved no less than four separate pay increases for him.

In Journey to Parnassus, published two years before his death in 1616, Cervantes claimed to have "lost the movement of the left hand for the glory of the right". As with much else, the extent of his disability is unclear, the only source being Cervantes himself, while commentators cite his habitual tendency to praise himself. However, they were serious enough to earn him six months in the Civic Hospital at Messina, Sicily.

Although he returned to service in July 1572, records show his chest wounds were still not completely healed in February 1573. Based mainly in Naples, he joined expeditions to Corfu and Navarino, and took part in the 1573 occupation of Tunis and La Goulette, which were recaptured by the Ottomans in 1574. Despite Lepanto, the war overall was an Ottoman victory, and the loss of Tunis a military disaster for Spain. Cervantes returned to Palermo, where he was paid off by the Duke of Sessa, who gave him letters of commendation.

In early September 1575, Cervantes and Rodrigo left Naples on the galley Sol; as they approached Barcelona on 26 September, their ship was captured by Ottoman corsairs, and the brothers taken to Algiers, to be sold as slaves, or – as was the case of Cervantes and his brother – held for ransom, if this would be more lucrative than their sale as slaves. Rodrigo was ransomed in 1577, but his family could not afford the fee for Cervantes, who was forced to remain. Turkish historian Rasih Nuri İleri found evidence suggesting Cervantes worked on the construction of the Kılıç Ali Pasha Complex, which means he spent at least part of his captivity in Istanbul.

By 1580, Spain was occupied with integrating Portugal, and suppressing the Dutch Revolt, while the Ottomans were at war with Persia; the two sides agreed a truce, leading to an improvement of relations. After almost five years, and four escape attempts, in 1580 Cervantes was set free by the Trinitarians, a religious charity that specialised in ransoming Christian captives, and returned to Madrid.

1580 to 1616: Later life and death

While Cervantes was in captivity, both Don John and the Duke of Sessa died, depriving him of two potential patrons, while the Spanish economy was in dire straits. This made finding employment difficult; other than a period in 1581 to 1582, when he was employed as an intelligence agent in North Africa, little is known of his movements prior to 1584.

In April of that year, Cervantes visited Esquivias, to help arrange the affairs of his recently deceased friend and minor poet, Pedro Lainez. There he met Catalina de Salazar y Palacios, eldest daughter of the widowed Catalina de Palacios; her husband died leaving only debts, but the elder Catalina owned some land of her own. This may be why in December 1584, Cervantes married her daughter, then between 15 and 18 years old. The first use of the name Cervantes Saavedra appears in 1586, on documents related to their marriage.

Shortly before this, his illegitimate daughter Isabel was born in November. Her mother, Ana Franca, was the wife of a Madrid innkeeper; they apparently concealed it from her husband, but Cervantes acknowledged paternity. When Ana Franca died in 1598, he asked his sister Magdalena to take care of his daughter.

In 1587, Cervantes was appointed as a government purchasing agent, then became a tax collector in 1592. He was briefly jailed several times for 'irregularities', but quickly released. Several applications for positions in Spanish America were rejected, although modern critics note images of the colonies appear in his work.

From 1596 to 1600, he lived primarily in Seville, then returned to Madrid in 1606, where he remained for the rest of his life. In later years, he received some financial support from the Count of Lemos, although he was excluded from the retinue Lemos took to Naples when appointed Viceroy in 1608. In July 1613, he joined the Third Order Franciscans, then a common way for Catholics to gain spiritual merit. It is generally accepted Cervantes died on 22 April 1616 (NS; the Gregorian calendar had superseded the Julian in 1582 in Spain and some other countries); the symptoms described, including intense thirst, correspond to diabetes, then untreatable.

In accordance with his will, Cervantes was buried in the Convent of the Barefoot Trinitarians, in central Madrid. His remains went missing when moved during rebuilding work at the convent in 1673, and in 2014, historian Fernando de Prado launched a project to rediscover them.

In January 2015, Francisco Etxeberria, the forensic anthropologist leading the search, reported the discovery of caskets containing bone fragments, and part of a board, with the letters 'M.C.'. Based on evidence of injuries suffered at Lepanto, on 17 March 2015 they were confirmed as belonging to Cervantes along with his wife and others. They were formally reburied at a public ceremony in June 2015.

Supposed likenesses
No authenticated portrait of Cervantes is known to exist. The one most often associated with the author is attributed to Juan de Jáuregui, but both names were added at a later date. The El Greco painting in the Museo del Prado, known as Retrato de un caballero desconocido (Portrait of an Unknown Gentleman), is cited as 'possibly' depicting Cervantes, but there is no evidence for this. It has been suggested that the portrait The Nobleman with his Hand on his Chest, also by El Greco, may possibly depict Cervantes. However, the Prado itself, while mentioning, in passing, that "specific names have been proposed for the sitter, including that of Cervantes", and even "that the painting could be a self-portrait [of El Greco]", goes on to state that "Without doubt, the most convincing suggestion has connected this figure with the Second Marquis of Montemayor, Juan de Silva y de Ribera, a contemporary of El Greco who was appointed military commander of the Alcázar in Toledo by Philip II and Chief Notary to the Crown, a position that would explain the solemn gesture of the hand, depicted in the act of taking an oath."

The portrait by Luis de Madrazo, at the Biblioteca Nacional de España, painted in 1859, was based on his imagination. The image that appears on Spanish euro coins of €0.10, €0.20, and €0.50 is based on a bust, created in 1905.

Literary career and legacy

Cervantes claimed to have written over 20 plays, such as El trato de Argel, based on his experiences in captivity. Such works were extremely short-lived, and even Lope de Vega, the best-known playwright of the day, could not live on their proceeds. In 1585, he published La Galatea, a conventional pastoral romance that received little contemporary notice; despite promising to write a sequel, he never did so.

Aside from these, and some poems, by 1605, Cervantes had not been published for 20 years. In Don Quixote, he challenged a form of literature that had been a favourite for more than a century, explicitly stating his purpose was to undermine 'vain and empty' chivalric romances. His portrayal of real life, and use of everyday speech in a literary context was considered innovative, and proved instantly popular. First published in January 1605, Don Quixote and Sancho Panza featured in masquerades held to celebrate the birth of Philip IV on 8 April.

He finally achieved a degree of financial security, while its popularity led to demands for a sequel. In the foreword to his 1613 work, Novelas ejemplares, dedicated to his patron, the Count of Lemos, Cervantes promises to produce one, but was pre-empted by an unauthorised version published in 1614, published under the name Alonso Fernández de Avellaneda. It is possible this delay was deliberate, to ensure support from his publisher and reading public; Cervantes finally produced the second part of Don Quixote in 1615.

The two parts of Don Quixote are different in focus, but similar in their clarity of prose and their realism. The first was more comic, and had greater popular appeal. The second part is often considered more sophisticated and complex, with a greater depth of characterisation and philosophical insight.

In addition to this, he produced a series of works between 1613 and his death in 1616. They include a collection of tales titled Exemplary Novels. This was followed by Viaje del Parnaso, Eight Comedies and Eight New Interludes, and Los trabajos de Persiles y Sigismunda, completed just before his death, and published posthumously in January 1617.

Cervantes was rediscovered by English writers in the mid-18th century. The literary editor John Bowle argued that Cervantes was as significant as any of the Greek and Roman authors then popular, and published an annotated edition in 1781. Now viewed as a significant work, at the time it proved a failure. However, Don Quixote has been translated into all major languages, in 700 editions. Mexican author Carlos Fuentes suggested that Cervantes and his contemporary William Shakespeare form part of a narrative tradition that includes Homer, Dante, Defoe, Dickens, Balzac, and Joyce.

Sigmund Freud claimed he learnt Spanish to read Cervantes in the original; he particularly admired The Dialogue of the Dogs (El coloquio de los perros), from Exemplary Tales, in which two dogs, Cipión and Berganza, share their stories; as one talks, the other listens, occasionally making comments. From 1871 to 1881, Freud and his close friend, Eduard Silberstein, wrote letters to each other, using the pennames Cipión and Berganza.

In 1905, the tricentennial of the publication of Don Quixote was marked with celebrations in Spain; the 400th anniversary of his death in 2016, saw the production of Cervantina, a celebration of his plays by the Compañía Nacional de Teatro Clásico in Madrid. The Miguel de Cervantes Virtual Library, the largest digital archive of Spanish-language historical and literary works in the world, is named after the author.

Man of La Mancha, the popular musical play of 1965, was based on Don Quixote.

Bibliography

As listed in Complete Works of Miguel de Cervantes:
 La Galatea (1585);
 El ingenioso hidalgo Don Quixote de la Mancha (1605): First volume of Don Quixote.
 Novelas ejemplares (1613): a collection of 12 short stories of varied types about the social, political, and historical problems of Cervantes's Spain:
 "La gitanilla" ("The Gypsy Girl")
 "El amante liberal" ("The Generous Lover")
 "Rinconete y Cortadillo" ("Rinconete & Cortadillo")
 "La española inglesa" ("The English Spanish Lady")
 "El licenciado Vidriera" ("The Lawyer of Glass")
 "La fuerza de la sangre" ("The Power of Blood")
 "El celoso extremeño" ("The Jealous Man From Extremadura")
 "La ilustre fregona" ("The Illustrious Kitchen-Maid")
 "Novela de las dos doncellas" ("The Novel of the Two Damsels")
 "Novela de la señora Cornelia" ("The Novel of Lady Cornelia")
 "Novela del casamiento engañoso" ("The Novel of the Deceitful Marriage")
 "El coloquio de los perros" ("The Dialogue of the Dogs")
 Segunda Parte del Ingenioso Cavallero [sic] Don Quixote de la Mancha (1615): Second volume of Don Quixote.
 Los trabajos de Persiles y Sigismunda (1617).

Other works

Cervantes is generally considered a mediocre poet; few of his poems survive.  Some appear in La Galatea, while he also wrote Dos Canciones à la Armada Invencible.

His sonnets are considered his best work, particularly Al Túmulo del Rey Felipe en Sevilla, Canto de Calíope and Epístola a Mateo Vázquez. Viaje del Parnaso, or Journey to Parnassus, is his most ambitious verse work, an allegory that consists largely of reviews of contemporary poets.

He published a number of dramatic works, including ten extant full-length plays:
 Trato de Argel; based on his own experiences, deals with the life of Christian slaves in Algiers;
 La Numancia; intended as a patriotic work, dramatization of the long and brutal siege of Numantia, by Scipio Aemilianus, completing the transformation of the Iberian peninsula into the Roman province Hispania, or España.
 El gallardo español,
 Los baños de Argel,
 La gran sultana, Doña Catalina de Oviedo,
 La casa de los celos,
 El laberinto de amor,
 La entretenida,
 El rufián dichoso,
 Pedro de Urdemalas, a sensitive play about a picaro, who joins a group of Gypsies for love of a girl.

He also wrote eight short farces (entremeses):
 El juez de los divorcios,
 El rufián viudo llamado Trampagos,
 La elección de los Alcaldes de Daganzo,
 La guarda cuidadosa (The Vigilant Sentinel),
 El vizcaíno fingido,
 El retablo de las maravillas,
 La cueva de Salamanca
 El viejo celoso (The Jealous Old Man).

These plays and entremeses, except for Trato de Argel and La Numancia, made up Ocho Comedias y ocho entreméses nuevos, nunca representados (Eight Comedies and Eight New Interludes, Never Before Performed), which appeared in 1615. The dates and order of composition of Cervantes's entremeses are unknown. Faithful to the spirit of Lope de Rueda, Cervantes endowed them with novelistic elements, such as simplified plot, the type of descriptions normally associated with a novel, and character development. Cervantes included some of his dramas among the works he was most satisfied with.

Influence

Places 
 Cervantes. A municipality in the province of Lugo, Galicia, Spain, but the name of the town is not based on Miguel de Cervantes (nor is there any evidence tying him or his family to this town).
 Cervantes.  A municipality in the province of Ilocos Sur, Philippines.
 Cervantes. A township situated north of the Western Australian state capital Perth in Australia.

Television 
 Cervantes is a recurring character in the Spanish television show El ministerio del tiempo, portrayed by actor Pere Ponce.
 Cervantes played a prominent role in the episode "Gentlemen of Spain" of the TV series Sir Francis Drake (1961–1962). He was portrayed by the actor Nigel Davenport and the plot had him heroically rescuing other Christian captives from the Barbary pirates.

See also 
 Casa de Cervantes
 Instituto Cervantes
 Miguel de Cervantes Prize
 Miguel de Cervantes European University
 Miguel de Cervantes Health Care Centre
 Miguel de Cervantes Liceum
 Miguel de Cervantes Memorial
 Miguel de Cervantes University

Notes

References

Citations

Sources

Further reading
  

 Bloom, Harold (ed.) 2001. Cervantes's Don Quixote (Modern Critical Interpretations).
 Bloom, Harold (ed.) 2005. Miguel de Cervantes (Modern Critical Views).
 Cascardi, Anthony J. (ed.) 2002. The Cambridge Companion to Cervantes.
 El Saffar, Ruth S. (ed.) 1986. Critical Essays on Cervantes. Boston: G. K. Hall.
 González Echevarría, Roberto (ed.) 2005. Cervantes' Don Quixote: A Casebook. 
 Nelson, Lowry  1969. Cervantes: A Collection of Critical Essays.  Englewood Cliffs, N.J.: Prentice-Hall.
 Pérez, Rolando (2016). "What is Don Quijote/Don Quixote And…And…And the Disjunctive Synthesis of Cervantes and Kathy Acker." Cervantes ilimitado: cuatrocientos años del Quijote. Ed. Nuria Morgado. ALDEEU. 75–100.
 Pérez, Rolando (2021). "Cervantes’s “Republic”: On Representation, Imitation, and Unreason". eHumanista 47: 89-111.
 Vázquez Montalbán, Manuel and Willi Glasauer (1988). Scenes from World Literature and Portraits of Greatest Authors, Círculo de Lectores.
 Weber, Olivier, Flammarion (2011). Le Barbaresque.

External links
 
 
 
 
 
 
 
 Biblioteca Virtual Miguel de Cervantes Spanish web site with multiple Cervantes links and audio of whole of Don Quixote
 Famous Hispanics
 The Cervantes Project with biographies and chronology
 Information about Miguel de Cervantes
 Cervantine Collection of the Biblioteca de Catalunya 
 Miguel de Cervantes (1547–1616): Life and Portrait The Cervantes Project. Canavaggio, Jean.
 Cervantes's Birthplace Museum
 Miguel de Cervantes Collection From the Rare Book and Special Collection Division at the Library of Congress
 Cervantes's short biography  (PDF)
 Cervantes chatbot in Spanish

 
1547 births
1616 deaths
16th-century dramatists and playwrights
16th-century male writers
16th-century Spanish novelists
16th-century Spanish poets
16th-century Spanish writers
17th-century male writers
17th-century Spanish dramatists and playwrights
17th-century Spanish novelists
17th-century Spanish poets
17th-century Spanish writers
Accountants
Barbary pirates
Baroque writers
Burials in Madrid
Deaths from diabetes
History of Algiers
History of literature
History of poetry
History of theatre
People from Alcalá de Henares
Ransom
Roman Catholic writers
Spanish Golden Age
Spanish male dramatists and playwrights
Spanish male novelists
Spanish male poets
Spanish novelists
Spanish people with disabilities
Spanish Roman Catholics
Spanish naval personnel
Tax collectors
Spanish duellists
Spanish Catholic poets
16th century in Algiers
16th-century slaves
Galley slaves
Slaves from the Ottoman Empire
Spanish writers
Slavery in Algeria